Rafael da Silveira Becker (born 2 April 1991) is a Brazilian professional golfer who is currently a member of Korn Ferry Tour.

Amateur career
As a junior, Becker twice won the Brazilian Junior Golf Championship in 2008 and 2009 and won the 2008 under 17s Faldo series event in Brazil.

As an amateur, Becker continued this success with three consecutive wins at the 2010, 2011 and 2012 Brazilian Amateur Championship. He also played in the 2012 Eisenhower Trophy in Turkey as part of the Brazilian team.

At college level, Becker represented the Wichita State Shockers during which time he was named Missouri Valley Conference Player of the Year in 2012 and was part of a team that won the Missouri Valley Conference title in each of his college years.

Professional career
Becker turned professional in August 2013 after graduating from Wichita State and earned his status on PGA Tour Latinoamérica for 2014 through qualifying at the Developmental Series Final Samsung Tournament in Lima, Peru.

Becker's first win as a professional came on the Brazilian Golf Circuit at the event at Porto Alegre Country Club. He followed this up with his first win on PGA Tour Latinoamérica by winning his national championship at the 2014 Aberto do Brasil.

Amateur wins
 2010 Brazilian Amateur
 2011 Brazilian Amateur
 2012 Brazilian Amateur

Professional wins (2)

PGA Tour Latinoamérica wins (1)

PGA Tour Latinoamérica Developmental Series wins (1)

Team appearances
Amateur
 Eisenhower Trophy (representing Brazil): 2010, 2012

References

External links
 
 

Brazilian male golfers
PGA Tour Latinoamérica golfers
Wichita State Shockers men's golfers
Sportspeople from São Paulo
1991 births
Living people